Dinan may refer to:

People 
Dinan Yahdian Javier (born 1995), Indonesian footballer
David de Dinan or David of Dinant (1160–1217), pantheistic philosopher
Daniel J. Dinan (born 1929), Special Trial Judge of the United States Tax Court
Desmond Dinan, (born 1957), Irish academic and Jean Monnet Professor at the George Mason School of Public Policy, in Arlington, Virginia
Josce de Dinan (died 1166), Anglo-Norman nobleman

Places 
Dinan, walled Breton town and commune in the Côtes-d'Armor department, northwestern France
 Dinan, Isfahan, village in Isfahan Province, Iran
 Dinan, Mazandaran, village in Mazandaran Province, Iran
Arrondissement of Dinan, Côtes-d'Armor département, in the Brittany région
Thoiré-sur-Dinan, commune in the Sarthe department in the region of Pays-de-la-Loire, north-western France

Other uses 
Dinan Cars, American automotive parts company
Dinan-Léhon FC, French football club in the Bretagne region
Khorram-Dinan or Khurramites, Iranian religious and political movement with its roots in the movement founded by Mazdak
River Dinan (Deen, Dinin), Ireland

See also
Denain
Dineen
Dioman
Donnan (disambiguation)